Steven Robert Weber (born March 4, 1961) is an American actor and comedian. He is best known for his role as Brian Hackett on the television series Wings which aired from April 1990 to May 1997 on NBC, as Sam Blue in Once and Again, and Jack Torrance in the TV miniseries adaptation of Stephen King's The Shining. He had a recurring role on iZombie as Vaughn du Clark. He played Mayor Douglas Hamilton on NCIS: New Orleans in a recurring role, and as Sergeant First Class Dennis Worcester in Hamburger Hill (1987).

Early life
Weber was born in Queens, New York. His mother, Fran (née Frankel), was a nightclub singer, and his father, Stuart Weber, was a nightclub performer and manager of Borscht Belt comedians. Weber embraces his Jewish heritage despite not having received a formal religious education. Weber graduated from Manhattan's High School of Performing Arts (1979) and the State University of New York at Purchase.

Career
Weber started appearing in TV commercials in the third grade. After leaving college, he became a member of the Mirror Repertory Company and appeared opposite legendary actress Geraldine Page and Mason Adams in "Paradise Lost" before winning a role as Julianne Moore's ill-tempered and ill-fated boyfriend on the CBS daytime drama As the World Turns in 1985–1986. He appeared in several motion pictures and TV mini-series, such as The Flamingo Kid, Hamburger Hill, and the acclaimed The Kennedys of Massachusetts (as the young John F. Kennedy).

His best-known role is as Brian Hackett, a skirt-chasing airplane pilot on the sitcom Wings. Several years later, Weber starred in his own short-lived half-hour comedy Cursed (later renamed The Weber Show), joined the cast of ABC's Once and Again as the tortured artist Sam Blue, and starred the next year in the acclaimed show The D.A., also for ABC. Weber also had lead roles in the 1990s films Single White Female and Jeffrey.

Weber first appeared on Broadway in Tom Stoppard's The Real Thing and in 2001-2002 took over for Matthew Broderick as Leo Bloom in the Broadway production of The Producers. In 2005, he appeared alongside Kevin Spacey in London at the Old Vic's production of National Anthems. Weber also wrote and produced 2003's Clubland, a Showtime film in which he and Alan Alda played father and son talent agents in 1950s New York City (for which Alda was nominated for an Emmy).

He appeared in four Stephen King adaptations: Desperation (2006), "You Know They Got a Hell of a Band" from the Nightmares & Dreamscapes (2006) mini-series, ”Revelations of Becka Paulson” from the “Outer Limits” revival series, and in the television mini-series version of Stephen King's The Shining (1997), playing the murderous writer Jack Torrance. He also narrated several audiobooks, including King's novel It and works by Harlan Coben and Dean Koontz. In 1998, he played the voice of wisecracking Alsatian Charlie B. Barkin in An All Dogs Christmas Carol, a role he earlier played in 1996 in All Dogs Go to Heaven: The Series.

In 2007, he rejoined former Wings co-star Tony Shalhoub in a guest role on Monk. The same year, Weber played the role of network boss Jack Rudolph in the NBC series Studio 60 on the Sunset Strip. In 2008, Weber starred in Alliance Group Entertainment's feature film Farm House, where he played Samael, a mysterious vineyard owner. Weber also guest starred on the drama series Brothers and Sisters as Graham Finch, a business specialist. He also guest-starred on Psych as Jack Spencer, Shawn Spencer's uncle and Henry Spencer's brother. He also starred on Desperate Housewives in 2008. Weber appeared as a recurring guest on the 2008–2009 season of the CBS crime drama Without a Trace.

He was part of the cast of the ABC show Happy Town and had a major role in the television film A Fairly Odd Movie: Grow Up, Timmy Turner! in which he played the villain Hugh Magnate. He stars occasionally in the live action comic Puddin''', alongside actor Eddie Pepitone. He narrated an unabridged audio book of Stephen King's It. Between 2012 and 2017, Weber provided the voices of several characters on the Disney XD animated series Ultimate Spider-Man. In 2014, Weber rejoined former Wings co-star Rebecca Schull in Chasing Life in recurring character roles. In 2017, Weber made a guest appearance in the Curb Your Enthusiasm (episode: "The Shucker"). In 2020, he starred opposite Fran Drescher in the NBC comedy Indebted.   
By 2021 he had begun a recurring role as Dr. Dean Archer in NBC's mega-hit Chicago Med''.

Personal life
Weber was married to actress Finn Carter from 1985 to 1992.

In 1995, he became engaged to Juliette Hohnen, then the Los Angeles bureau chief for MTV News, and they married on July 29 that year at Highclere Castle in Berkshire, England. In March 2013, it was reported that the couple filed for divorce.

Weber is a member of the Democratic Party.

Filmography

Film

Television

Theatre

Radio/podcast/audio book

References

External links

 
 
 Steven Weber at Internet Off-Broadway Database
 Steven Weber's Huffington Post Blog

1961 births
Living people
American male film actors
American male soap opera actors
American male television actors
American male voice actors
Audiobook narrators
Fiorello H. LaGuardia High School alumni
Jewish American male actors
Male actors from New York City
New York (state) Democrats
People from Briarwood, Queens
State University of New York at Purchase alumni
20th-century American male actors
21st-century American male actors
21st-century American Jews